The Drama Desk Award for Outstanding Sound Design was an annual award presented by Drama Desk in recognition of achievements in the theatre among Broadway, Off Broadway and Off-Off Broadway productions. The category was created in 1980, to honor designers of both musicals and plays. It was later split in the 2010 ceremony, to honor plays and musicals separately.

Winners and nominees

1980s

1990s

2000s

See also
 Laurence Olivier Award for Best Sound Design
 Tony Award for Best Sound Design
 Drama Desk Award for Outstanding Sound Design in a Musical
 Drama Desk Award for Outstanding Sound Design in a Play

References

External links
 Drama Desk official website

Sound Design